Few of the letters and writings of George Frideric Handel remain today—certainly far fewer than remain for other major composers. Handel wrote relatively few letters and kept no diary, yet those letters that do remain provide insight into the various aspects of Handel's life. One reason for the small number of surviving letters is that Handel did not hold any office that would require the collecting and saving of his records and writings.

All remaining letters and writings maintain a uniformly polite tone. A typical complimentary closing (used in many letters) was: "Sr, Your most obliged and most humble servant, GEORGE FRIDERIC HANDEL".

The letter dated 30 September 1749 is reproduced in the pdf document cited at its entry below.

Letters and writings
The following table lists the known letters and writings of Handel. Note that where quotes have been supplied from the letters, the original spelling, punctuation and capitalisations have been reproduced.

See also
 George Frideric Handel
 Will of George Frideric Handel
 List of compositions by George Frideric Handel
 Handel Reference Database

References

George Frideric Handel

es:Cartas y escritos de Georg Friedrich Händel#top